James Ogilvie (c. 1866 – July 12, 1950)  was a physician and surgeon as well as an American football player and coach.   He served the third head football coach at New York University (NYU).  He held that position for the 1899 season, leading the NYU Violets to a record of 2–6.  One of the two wins for his team was a 6–5 victory over Rutgers  In at least two other games, against Hamilton and Columbia, the team produced what were considered to be poor performances.  Ogilvie was referred to at least one time as "Dr. Ogilvie" and had previously played as a guard at Williams College from 1891 to 1894, a member of the class of 1895. He also attended Columbia University, where he received his M. D.

Head coaching record

References

Year of birth missing
1860s births
1950 deaths
19th-century players of American football
American football guards
NYU Violets football coaches
Williams Ephs football players
Physicians from New York (state)
People from Lawrence, Massachusetts